Normal(s) or The Normal(s) may refer to:

Film and television
 Normal (2003 film), starring Jessica Lange and Tom Wilkinson
 Normal (2007 film), starring Carrie-Anne Moss, Kevin Zegers, Callum Keith Rennie, and Andrew Airlie
 Normal (2009 film), an adaptation of Anthony Neilson's 1991 play Normal: The Düsseldorf Ripper
 Normal!, a 2011 Algerian film
 The Normals (film), a 2012 American comedy film
 "Normal" (New Girl), an episode of the TV series

Mathematics
 Normal (geometry), an object such as a line or vector that is perpendicular to a given object
 Normal basis (of a Galois extension), used heavily in cryptography
 Normal bundle
 Normal cone, of a subscheme in algebraic geometry
 Normal coordinates, in differential geometry, local coordinates obtained from the exponential map (Riemannian geometry)
 Normal distribution, the Gaussian continuous probability distribution
 Normal equations, describing the solution of the linear least squares problem
 Normal extensions (or quasi-Galois), field extensions, splitting fields for a set of polynomials over the base field
 Normal family, a pre-compact family of continuous functions
 Normal function, in set theory
 Normal invariants, in geometric topology
 Normal matrix, a matrix that commutes with its conjugate transpose
 Normal measure, in set theory
 Normal number, a real number with a "uniform" distribution of digits
 Normal operator, an operator that commutes with its Hermitian adjoint
 Normal order of an arithmetic function, a type of asymptotic behavior useful in number theory
 Normal polytopes, in polyhedral geometry and computational commutative algebra
 Normal ring, a reduced ring whose localizations at prime ideals are integrally closed domains
 Normal scheme, a scheme whose local rings are normal domains
 Normal sequence (disambiguation), either a normal function or a representation of a normal number
 Normal space (or ), spaces, topological spaces characterized by separation of closed sets
 Normal subgroup, a subgroup invariant under conjugation

Music
 Normal (album), a 2005 album by Ron "Bumblefoot" Thal
 "Normal" (Alonzo song)
 "Normal" (Eminem song)
 "Normal", a song by Gucci Mane
 "Normal", a song by Porcupine Tree from Nil Recurring
 "Normal", a song by AJR from The Click (Deluxe Edition)
 The Normal, a recording project of English music producer Daniel Miller
 The Normals (Christian band), an American Christian alternative rock band
 The Normals (New Orleans band), a 1970s American punk band

Places
 Normal, Alabama
 Normal, Illinois
 Normal, Indiana
 Normal, Kentucky
 Normal, Ohio
 Normal Station, Memphis

Transportation
 Normal metro station, in Mexico City
 Uptown Station, otherwise known as Normal Station, in Illinois

Other
 Norm (social), collective representations of acceptable group conduct
 Normal: The Düsseldorf Ripper, a 1991 play by Anthony Neilson
 Normal concentration, a measure of concentration for a chemical in a solution
 Normal goods, a concept used in economics
 Normal modes, of vibration in an oscillating system
 Normal order, or Wick order in Quantum Field Theory
 Normal school, a school created to train high school graduates to be teachers
 Charles Normal (born 1965), American record producer
 Henry Normal (born 1956), English comedian
 The Normals, a novel by David Gilbert

See also
 Norm (disambiguation)
 Normal closure (disambiguation)
 Normal Field (disambiguation)
 Normal form (disambiguation)
 Normal order (disambiguation)
 Normal Township (disambiguation)
 Normality (disambiguation)
 Normalization (disambiguation)
 Normalsi, a Polish rock band
 Leaving Normal (disambiguation)
 New Normal (disambiguation)
 Usual (disambiguation)